The Natural Four is the second album by the Oakland, California group The Natural Four, released in 1974 on Curtom Records.

Track listing
"Can This Be Real" (Janice Hutson, Leroy Hutson, Michael Hawkins) -  	 3:28   	
"You Bring Out the Best in Me" (Leroy Hutson, Michael Hawkins) -	4:37 	
"Try Love Again" (Joe Reaves, Leroy Hutson, Michael Hawkins) -	4:28 	
"You Can't Keep Running Away" (Leroy Hutson, Michael Hawkins) -	3:28 	
"This Is What's Happening Now" (A.J. Tribble, George Davis) -	4:08 	
"Love That Really Counts" (Janice Hutson, Leroy Hutson, Michael Hawkins, Joe Reaves) -	4:20 	
"Try to Smile" (Larry Brownlee, Lowrell Simon) -	2:58 	
"Love's Society" (Leroy Hutson, Joseph Scott, Roger Anfinsen) -	3:20 	
"Things Will Be Better Tomorrow" (Rich Tufo) -	3:30

Personnel
The Natural Four
Darryl Cannady
Delmos Whitley
Ollan Christopher James
Steve Striplin

Charts

Singles

References

External links
 The Natural Four-The Natural Four at Discogs

1974 albums
The Natural Four albums
Curtom Records albums
Albums produced by Leroy Hutson
Albums produced by Lowrell Simon